Mercury is the debut studio album by the Norwegian heavy metal band Madder Mortem. The members involved on this release left shortly after, leaving only BP and Agnete M. Kirkevaag. The music is described as "dreamy" with folk elements. Following this release, the band's music took an extreme turn towards heavier elements.

Track listing

Personnel 
Madder Mortem
Agnete M. Kirkevaag – lead vocals
BP M. Kirkevaag – guitars, synth, backing vocals
Christian Ruud – guitars, backing vocals
Boye Nyberg – bass
Sigurd Nielsen – drums, percussion

Additional musicians
 Synth and programming by Henning Ramseth except on "Under Another Moon" by BP M. Kirkevaag
 Synth arrangements by Henning Ramseth and Madder Mortem

Production
Produced by Madder Mortem
Engineered by Fridtjof A. Lindeman and Fredrik Darum
Mixed by Fridtjof A. Lindeman and Madder Mortem
Mastering by Tom Kvålsvoll at Strype Audio

References 

1999 debut albums
Madder Mortem albums
Misanthropy Records albums